In the 2011–12 season, Al Sadd SC competed in the Qatar Stars League for the 39th season, as well as the Emir of Qatar Cup the Crown Prince Cup and the Champions League.

They won the 2011 AFC Champions League Final against Jeonbuk, 4–2 on penalties. This earned them a spot in the 2011 FIFA Club World Cup.

To date, this is the best result achieved by a Qatari team in the AFC Champions League under its new format. Al Sadd also became the first team to reach the AFC Champions League knockout stage after starting their campaign in the play-offs in February. Furthermore, Al Sadd was crowned "AFC Club of the Year" in 2011 by AFC after their Champions League conquest. Championship 2011 in honor of the club's owner changed the team logo and stars to commemorate the AFC Champions League 1988. 2011 was etched on the shirt Wolves.

During the 2011 FIFA Club World Cup, Al Sadd were eliminated in the semifinal by Barcelona, which set up a third-place meeting between them and Kashiwa Reysol. This was the first time two clubs from the same confederation faced off each other in a third-place match. Al Sadd won the encounter on penalties in order to be the first West Asian club to claim the bronze medal in the FIFA Club World Cup.

Competitions

Overview

{| class="wikitable" style="text-align: center"
|-
!rowspan=2|Competition
!colspan=8|Record
!rowspan=2|Started round
!rowspan=2|Final position / round
!rowspan=2|First match	
!rowspan=2|Last match
|-
!
!
!
!
!
!
!
!
|-
| Qatar Stars League

| Matchday 1
| 4th
| 18 September 2011
| 13 April 2012
|-
| Emir of Qatar Cup

| Quarter-final 
| style="background:silver;"| Runners–up 
| 5 May 2012
| 12 May 2012
|-
| Qatar Crown Prince Cup

| Semi-finals 
| style="background:silver;"| Runners–up
| 21 April 2012
| 26 April 2012
|-
| Champions League

| Quarterfinal 
| style="background:gold;"| Winners 
| 14 September 2011
| 5 November 2011
|-
| FIFA Club World Cup

| Quarterfinal 
| bgcolor=#cc9966| Third place 
| 11 December 2011
| 18 December 2011
|-
! Total

Qatar Stars League

League table

Results summary

Results by round

Matches

Emir of Qatar Cup

Crown Prince Cup

AFC Champions League

Knockout stage

Quarterfinals

Semifinals

Final

FIFA Club World Cup

Squad information

Playing statistics

|-
! colspan=16 style=background:#dcdcdc; text-align:center| Goalkeepers

|-
! colspan=16 style=background:#dcdcdc; text-align:center| Defenders

|-
! colspan=16 style=background:#dcdcdc; text-align:center| Midfielders

|-
! colspan=16 style=background:#dcdcdc; text-align:center| Forwards

|-
! colspan=16 style=background:#dcdcdc; text-align:center| Players transferred out during the season

Goalscorers
Includes all competitive matches. The list is sorted alphabetically by surname when total goals are equal.

Transfers

In

Out

Notes

References

Al Sadd SC seasons
Qatari football clubs 2011–12 season